The 2018–19 season was Middlesbrough's second consecutive season in the Championship in their 143rd year in existence; the club also competed in the FA Cup and the EFL Cup.

Season overview
The 2018–19 transfer window is club manager Tony Pulis' first official summer transfer window as Middlesbrough manager. Pulis' first signing of the window was a defensive Paddy McNair, arriving from rivals Sunderland for £5 million. Bristol City star defender Aden Flint subsequently joined the club for a fee of £7 million. Sam Stubbs and Djed Spence then joined the reserves, both on free transfers, arriving from Wigan Athletic and Fulham respectively. As August emerged, Andy Lonergan joined the club on a free transfer from rivals Leeds United. On 8 August 2018, Middlesbrough completed the signing of Jordan Hugill from West Ham United on a season-long loan deal.

Tomás Mejías, Martin Cranie, Tom Brewitt, Liam Cooke, Liam Hegarty, Jakub Sinior, Keiran Storey, Robbie Tinkler, Jay Wilson and Matthew Elsdon were all released at the end of the 2017–18 season. Antonio Barragán then left the club to join Real Betis permanently, having spent the previous season on loan there, while Mikael Soisalo and Fábio left to join Zulte Waregem and Nantes respectively. Players who were loaned out included Joe Fryer to Carlisle United, Hayden Coulson to St Mirren, Luke Armstrong to Gateshead, George Miller to Bradford City. The club then said their goodbyes to their team superstars: striker Patrick Bamford to Leeds, centre-back Ben Gibson and winger Adama Traoré.

Squad

First team squad

 L = Player on Loan

Competitions

Pre-season friendlies
As part of their pre-season preparations, Middlesbrough faced Sturm Graz, Spennymoor Town, SV Sandhausen, Accrington Stanley, Rochdale and Hartlepool United. Their match against Sunderland was abandoned at half-time because of storm conditions.

Championship

League table

Results by matchday

Result summary

Matches
On 21 June 2018, the Championship fixtures for the forthcoming season were announced.

FA Cup

The third round draw was made live on BBC by Ruud Gullit and Paul Ince from Stamford Bridge on 3 December 2018. The fourth round draw was made live on BBC by Robbie Keane and Carl Ikeme from Wolverhampton on 7 January 2019.

EFL Cup

On 15 June 2018, the draw for the first round was made in Vietnam. The second round draw was made from the Stadium of Light on 16 August. The third round draw was made on 30 August 2018 by David Seaman and Joleon Lescott. The fourth round draw was made live on Quest by Rachel Yankey and Rachel Riley on 29 September. The draw for the quarter-final was made live on Sky Sports by Jamie Redknapp and Jimmy Floyd Hasselbaink on 31 October.

Transfers

Transfers in

Transfers out

Loans in

Loans out

References

Middlesbrough F.C. seasons
Middlesbrough